Intermodulation is a 1966 jazz album by pianist Bill Evans and jazz guitarist Jim Hall. It is a follow-up to their 1962 collaboration Undercurrent.

Reception 

Writing for Allmusic, music critic Michael G. Nastos wrote of the album: "A duet recording between pianist Bill Evans and guitarist Jim Hall is one that should retain high expectations to match melodic and harmonic intimacies with brilliant spontaneous musicianship. Where this recording delivers that supposition is in the details and intricacy with which Evans and Hall work, guided by simple framings of standard songs made into personal statements that include no small amounts of innovation... At only 32 and a half minutes, it's disappointing there are no bonus tracks and/or additional material for a CD-length reissue, but Intermodulation still remains a precious set of music from these two great modern jazz musicians."

Track listing 
"I've Got You Under My Skin" (Cole Porter) – 3:24
"My Man's Gone Now" (George Gershwin, Ira Gershwin, DuBose Heyward) – 6:46
"Turn Out the Stars" (Bill Evans) – 7:37
"Angel Face" (Joe Zawinul) – 6:37
"Jazz Samba" (Claus Ogerman) – 3:10
"All Across the City" (Jim Hall) – 4:48

Tracks 3 and 6 recorded on April 7, 1966; the rest recorded on May 10, 1966.

Personnel
Bill Evans – piano
Jim Hall – guitar

References

External links
Jazz Discography entries for Bill Evans
Bill Evans Memorial Library discography

1966 albums
Bill Evans albums
Jim Hall (musician) albums
Albums produced by Creed Taylor
Albums recorded at Van Gelder Studio
Verve Records albums
Collaborative albums